The International Workers League (Fourth International), also known as IWLfi ( and LITci;  or LIT-QI) is a Morenist Trotskyist international organisation.

Overview
The group's origins lie in the International Committee of the Fourth International (ICFI).  Moreno's supporters followed the American Socialist Workers Party in leaving the ICFI in 1963 to form the reunified Fourth International (USFI).  In 1969, the USFI voted to support guerrilla war in Latin America.  Moreno's group opposed this. It was reduced to sympathiser status.

While critical of the Sandinistas, Moreno's group sent a Simon Bolivar Brigade to Nicaragua to aid the Civil War, with the aim of building a revolutionary party there.  This brigade was opposed by the reunified Fourth International because it operated outside the discipline of the FSLN; the only other Trotskyists to participate were Pierre Lamberts' Organising Committee for the Reconstruction of the Fourth International. Forty non-Nicaraguan members of the Brigade were expelled from the country by the FSLN. Almost immediately, Moreno's and Lambert's tendencies joined to form the Parity Committee for the Reconstruction of the Fourth International. However, Moreno's supporters withdrew in 1981 complaining that Lambert had links to trade union bureaucrats, and in 1982 formed the "International Workers League (Fourth International)".  In addition to their former supporters, this also attracted groups in Peru and Venezuela which split from the Lambertist currents.

The group campaigned for the victory of Argentina in the Falklands War, for the non-payment of foreign debt, and for the "defeat of imperialism in the Gulf War."  In the mid-1990s, it helped launch Workers' Aid to Bosnia and began working with the Workers International to Rebuild the Fourth International, although that group is now inactive.

Disagreements following the death of Moreno led several sections to leave the international, while others split.  Those who left founded the  International Centre of Orthodox Trotskyism (CITO in Spanish).  The majority of this group rejoined the International Workers League in 2005, the minority forming the International Socialist League.

In 2021 the Chilean section of the IWLfi elected a member to the constitutional convention. María Rivera was elected in district 8 (Santiago West) as part of The List of the People. 

The LITci publishes the bulletin International Courier (Correo Internacional) and the journal Marxism Alive (Marxismo Vivo or Le Marxisme Vivant), both in various languages, principally Spanish.

Sections

Official Sections

Sympathizing Sections

Notes

References
Alicia Sagra, A Brief Outline of the History of the IWL

External links

List of IWLfi Parties